Carlton E. Davidson (June 26, 1905 – July 20, 1984) was a member of the Ohio House of Representatives.

References

Republican Party members of the Ohio House of Representatives
1905 births
1984 deaths
20th-century American politicians